Anthony Barnett may refer to:

 Anthony Barnett (writer) (born 1942), British writer; Director of Charter 88, 1988–1995
 Anthony Barnett (poet), English poet and music historian
 Tony Barnett (born 1952), Australian basketball player

See also
Antony Barnett, a British investigative journalist